Woolloongabba railway station is a railway station currently under construction as part of the Cross River Rail project in the Brisbane suburb of Woolloongabba.

To be built as an underground station beneath The Gabba, it will consist of two platforms with a connection to Woolloongabba busway station. Construction commenced in November 2019, with it scheduled to open in 2024.  The platforms are built at a depth of 27 metres.  Their length is 220 metres.

Construction
The station is built using a full cavern construction method. It was important to design lifts and elevators that can handle the expected surge capacity during large sports events at the nearby Gabba.  Similar to Boggo Road railway station the ground is heavily fractured, but at Woolloongabba the cavern sits underneath a layer of that kind of rock.  The cavern was excavated using roadheaders.

During construction a toothpaste box, a perfume bottle and bottles that once contained alcohol as well as other food items were found. Animal bones, including pig, sheep goats and cows and pieces of leather from shoes, shoe soles, leather belts and off cuts were also discovered.

The station served as the main support site for the construction project.  It was centrally located and had adequate space for materials that created handling and logistical support efficiencies.  The site handled the majority of spoil handling movements, having good access to the Pacific Motorway.

See also

Rail transport in South East Queensland

References

Proposed railway stations in Australia

Railway stations located underground in Australia

Railway stations scheduled to open in 2024
Woolloongabba